Kishitani Dam  is an earthfill dam located in Kyoto Prefecture in Japan. The dam is used for water supply. The catchment area of the dam is 1.6 km2. The dam impounds about 2  ha of land when full and can store 210 thousand cubic meters of water. The construction of the dam was started on 1917 and completed in 1921.

See also
List of dams in Japan

References

Dams in Kyoto Prefecture